Holtsmark is a surname. Notable people with the surname include:

Anne Holtsmark (1896–1974), Norwegian philologist
Bent Holtsmark (1823–1903), Norwegian politician
Bernt Holtsmark (1859–1941), Norwegian politician
Gabriel Gabrielsen Holtsmark (1867–1954), Norwegian educator, physicist and actuary
Johan Peter Holtsmark (1894–1975), Norwegian physicist
Karen Holtsmark (1907–1998), Norwegian painter
Torger Holtsmark (1863–1926), Norwegian politician